What Are You Doing Today? (Hangul: 오늘 뭐해?; RR: oneul mwohae?) is the second extended play by South Korean girl group Hello Venus. It was released on December 12, 2012, by Tricell Media and distributed by NHN Entertainment.

Release 
The EP was digitally released on December 12, 2012, through several music portals, including MelOn in South Korea, and iTunes for the global market.

Track listing
Digital download

References

2012 EPs
Dance-pop EPs
Korean-language EPs
Hello Venus albums